The Goat Island is a small and unpopulated granite island, located in the Bass Strait, lying off the north-west coast of Tasmania, Australia. The island is situated between Penguin and Ulverstone and can be walked to at low tide. It houses a breeding colony of little penguins.

Along with the nearby Three Sisters, the island is part of the  Three Sisters – Goat Island Nature Reserve.

See also

 List of islands of Tasmania

References

External links
 

Islands of North West Tasmania
Central Coast Council (Tasmania)
Islands of Bass Strait